Helen de Hoop (born 1964) is a Dutch linguist and Professor of Theoretical Linguistics at Radboud University Nijmegen. She is known for her works on the relationship between the form and interpretation of language.

Education and career 
de Hoop has an M.A. (1987) and a Ph.D. (1992) from the University of Groningen. As of 2022 her dissertation has been cited over 840 times. She did postdoctoral work at the Utrecht University from 1997 until 2000. In 2001 she joined Radboud University Nijmegen where she was promoted to professor in 2007. de Hoop has been editor at the Journal of Linguistics since 2015.

Selected publications 
de Hoop has over 150 publications with an h-index of 32.

References

Living people
Linguists from the Netherlands
1964 births
Semanticists
University of Groningen alumni
Academic staff of Radboud University Nijmegen